Gug Tappeh Rural District is in the Central District of Bileh Savar County, Ardabil province, Iran. At the census of 2006, its population was 11,391 in 2,335 households; there were 11,688 inhabitants in 3,068 households at the following census of 2011; and in the most recent census of 2016, the population of the rural district was 9,972 win 2,953 households. The largest of its 18 villages was Babak, with 2,656 people.

References 

Bileh Savar County

Rural Districts of Ardabil Province

Populated places in Ardabil Province

Populated places in Bileh Savar County